Brothers and Sisters is an American sitcom that aired on NBC from January to April 1979. The series attempted to capitalize on the success of the 1978 motion picture National Lampoon's Animal House. It was the second of three frat-house comedy series to air in early 1979 (the others were ABC's Delta House and CBS' Co-Ed Fever).

Synopsis
Brothers and Sisters takes place on the campus of Crandall College, with William Windom starring as Dean Larry Crandall. Chris Lemmon (Milos "Checko" Sabolcik), Jon Cutler (Larry Zipper), and Randy Brooks (Ronald Holmes III) play three students who live in the basement of Pi Nu fraternity, nicknamed "Le Dump". Rather than attend class, the three cellar-dwellers create havoc with the more strait-laced members of the fraternity, and interact with the Gamma Iota sorority sisters who live nearby.

On January 21, NBC debuted Brothers and Sisters as a follow-up to their telecast of Super Bowl XIII, three days after ABC aired the first episode of its Animal House-inspired series (which was, in fact, the official series in everything but name). Two weeks later (February 4), Co-Ed Fever made its debut on CBS after a broadcast of the motion picture Rocky, but all three "frat-house" series were off the air by the end of April (with Co-Ed Fever having only one episode broadcast) after all of them ran into trouble with the networks' Standards and Practices departments because of their content. Brothers and Sisters made its last appearance on April 6, 1979; Delta House followed suit on April 21, 1979.

Of the three (if CBS' series had been picked up), Brothers and Sisters was arguably the least successful of them (mainly because of the networks having three similar shows, not to mention NBC's own woes at the time), with the show's lack of success apparent when series regular Mary Crosby turned up as a celebrity on NBC's Hollywood Squares for a week in March 1979; host Peter Marshall mentioned Brothers and Sisters as airing "on another network", only to be informed by Crosby that they were, in fact, on the same network.

Cast
 Chris Lemmon as Milos "Checko" Sabolcik
 William Windom as Larry Crandall
 Mary Crosby as Suzy Cooper
 Randy Brooks as Ronald Holmes III
 Larry Anderson as Harlan Ramsey
 Jon Cutler as Stanley Zipper
 Roy Teicher as Seymour
 Amy Johnston as Mary Lee

Episodes

References

Tim Brooks and Earle Marsh, The Complete Directory to Prime Time Network and Cable TV Shows 1946-Present 
TV Guide Guide to TV (2006)

External links
 

1979 American television series debuts
1979 American television series endings
1970s American sitcoms
1970s American college television series
English-language television shows
NBC original programming
Super Bowl lead-out shows
Television series by CBS Studios
Television shows set in Boston